The 2020 Dalian Professional F.C. season was the 11th season in club history.

Overview

Preseason (until July) 
On 21 January 2020, Wanda Group announced officially switched to new team name Dalian Professional Football Club, or Dalian Pro F.C., and came up with a new emblem design featuring a vintage Dalian Wanda F.C. logo. On the final day of the winter transfer window, Yannick Carrasco rejoined Atlético Madrid on loan until the end of the La Liga season.

In February, the start of the 2020 Chinese Super League season was postponed due to the coronavirus pandemic. Dalian Pro was in Murcia, Spain at the time for pre-season and were forced to extend their stay within Spain as ll travel to China was suspended. In March, as the coronavirus began spreading through Spain and the rest of Europe, Dalian Pro managed to fly back to China. Benitez with two new signings Sam Larsson and Marcus Danielson flew to Hong Kong for visas but they were initially unsuccessful and the two players went back to Sweden to train with IFK Göteborg and Djurgårdens IF respectively.

On 30 May, Tao Qianglong went out for drinking with 5 other players when training with China U-19 national team, which broke the national team regulation. All six players received 6-month suspensions from club games, and were each banned from China national teams. Dalian Pro downgraded him to the reserve team.

On 11 June, Dalian Pro became the first CSL team to obtain visas for foreign players after the ban.

July

On 1 July 2020, Chinese Football Association announced the 2020 season to resume on 25 July. Teams were divided in two groups to compete in two cities, Dalian and Suzhou, while audiences were not allowed. Dalian Sports Center, Jinzhou Stadium and Dalian Pro Soccer Academy Base were selected as hosting stadiums.

During the first match against Shandong Luneng, Rondon scored the first goal in this season, and Danielson had his debut goal, but Dalian was still defeated by a Marouane Fellaini hat-trick.

August
As the first cycle of the regular season finished by the end of August, Dalian Pro could not acquire a single win out of 7 games, resulting 3 draws, 4 losses, 10 goals scored, and 14 conceded. Ten of the fourteen goals allowed were conceded after the 70th minute of matches.

The club's first victory of the season came on 29 August against Shandong Luneng with Lin Liangming scoring the only goal of the game. This was also Dalian's first win without Carrasco in the starting eleven since 2018 (five matches in 2018, five in 2019, and seven in 2020).

September 
Danielson's head was lacerated against Guangzhou R&F.  His absence brought another two losses, which locked Dalian Pro down at 7th position, to compete in the relegation stage.

October 
For the October FIFA calendar, Hamsik left the team to join the Slovakia national team. As the strict quarantine policy for foreigners entering China was still active, he might miss most secondary stage matches upon his return, so Dalian Pro removed him from the squad, and signed Jailson instead. Rondon, however, stayed with the team. He was called up by the Venezuela national team, and he intended to leave, too. But FIFA continued the policy that allowed clubs to not release the player just before his departure, while Dalian Pro and Benitez relied heavily upon his attacking role, so he eventually stayed.

Dalian Pro Women's F.C. completed 2020 season at 3rd place in the Chinese Women's Football League.

Dalian Pro overpowered the first opponent Shijiazhuang Ever Bright in the relegation stage by 3-2 aggregate. Sun Guowen scored in the first loss, while Lin Liangming and Wang Yaopeng both scored decisive header in the second leg. Dalian Pro ensured a position above 12th, that the team were safely prevented from relegation. Rondon returned to Venezuela after this match to prepare for incoming national team games.

November 
Dalian acquired an easy win from Guangzhou R&F. Danielson was called up by Sweden national team, and left the team after this match. Larsson would also enjoy his early vacation, as he got his fourth yellow card before the last match. With only two foreign players against four, Dalian shamefully lost by 4–3 in aggregate eventually. Local media described this loss ironically as a "Reversed Miracle of Istanbul".

Summary 

Dalian Pro registered more young players than other teams, and put multiple experienced elder players in the reserves, which was considered "youth storm" by most media. However, the newly registered young players seldom gained chances to play. Throughout the season, Tong Lei and Lin Liangming had impressive performances as under-23 players, but for other young players under 23, only those with previous appearances in the 2019 season were occasionally used as substitution. On one hand, the team was under the pressure of relegation, a risky situation to use young players. On the other hand, the special season allowed teams to use up to 4 foreign players, which further seized playing time of domestic players. Anyway, this situation was often criticized by local media, especially when the team faced difficulties or had unsatisfactory results, and had to use elder players like Zhao Xuri, Zheng Long and Sun Bo. However, Benitez explained his point of view in many press conferences and his personal blog, that result of the 2020 season was unimportant, and that young players needed time to gain experience.

Benitez switched to 4-defender based tactic in this season with the signing of Marcus Danielson. In most conditions, a 4-5-1 formation would be used, with Rondon serving as the single striker. Great improvements on passing and crossing could be seen comparing with last season, especially Tong Lei's long passes and crosses. Sam Larsson was considered a downgraded replacement for Carrrasco at first due to the new restriction of transfer fee, but he displayed various skills and strong spirit, and proved to be a worthy foreign player for the team. Together with Danielson, they were described to have "continued the impressive tradition of ". In the first stage, the team covered more distance in total, while Hamsik and Rondon topped player running distance. On the other hand, the team relied heavily on Rondon, Larsson and Hamsik, and lacked other scoring tactics when either of them was absent.

Squad

First team squad

Reserve squad

C Squad (not used in the season)

Out on loan

Coaching staff

Transfers 
Due to the COVID-19, Chinese FA applied for a temporary transfer window, and was approved by FIFA.

Pre-season

In

Out

Mid-season

In

Out

Friendlies

Preseason

Chinese Super League

Regular season

Group A table

Results summary

Position by round

Fixtures and results 
Fixtures as of 13 July 2020

Relegation stage

9th to 16th place faceoff

9th to 12th place faceoff

11th to 12th place faceoff

Chinese FA Cup

FA Cup fixtures and results

Squad statistics

Appearances and goals

Goalscorers

Disciplinary record

Suspensions

References 

Dalian Professional F.C. seasons
Dalian Professional F.C.